Alyaksandr Tsishkevich (born 16 February 1986) is a Belarusian former professional footballer.

Career
In August 2016, Tsishkevich was one of several Isloch Minsk Raion players alleged to be involved in match fixing during their match with Dinamo Brest on 30 April 2016. On 20 February 2018, the BFF banned him from football for life for his involvement in the match-fixing.

References

External links
 

1986 births
Living people
Belarusian footballers
Belarusian expatriate footballers
Expatriate footballers in the Czech Republic
Expatriate footballers in Armenia
Expatriate footballers in Poland
Belarusian expatriate sportspeople in Poland
Expatriate footballers in Hungary
Expatriate footballers in Lithuania
FC RUOR Minsk players
FC Dinamo Minsk players
FC Naftan Novopolotsk players
Olimpia Elbląg players
FC Vitebsk players
FC Belshina Bobruisk players
FC Ararat Yerevan players
FC Slavia Mozyr players
FC Granit Mikashevichi players
Zalaegerszegi TE players
FC DSK Gomel players
FC Isloch Minsk Raion players
Association football defenders